Joseph Roche Lundrigan (born September 12, 1948) is a Canadian former ice hockey defenceman who played 52 games in the National Hockey League with the Toronto Maple Leafs and Washington Capitals during the 1972–73 and 1974–75 seasons. He was originally signed in 1971 by the Maple Leafs, and was claimed by the Capitals in the 1974 NHL Expansion Draft. The rest of his career, which lasted from 1967 to 1986, was spent in the minor leagues.

Playing career
As a youth, he played in the 1960 and 1961 Quebec International Pee-Wee Hockey Tournaments with Corner Brook. He won two all-Newfoundland senior hockey championships with the Corner Brook Royals in 1968 and 1977. In 1971–72 with the Tulsa Oilers of the Central Hockey League, he was voted as the club’s top defenceman and named to the league’s second all-star team. He was inducted into the Newfoundland and Labrador Hockey Hall of Fame in 1995. His # 2 jersey was retired by the Corner Brook Royals.

Career statistics

Regular season and playoffs

References

External links
 
 HockeyNL.ca

1948 births
Living people
Canadian ice hockey defencemen
Hershey Bears players
Ice hockey people from Newfoundland and Labrador
Oklahoma City Blazers (1965–1977) players
People from Corner Brook
Richmond Robins players
Toronto Maple Leafs players
Tulsa Oilers (1964–1984) players
Undrafted National Hockey League players
Washington Capitals players